The Disabled American Veterans of Texas Monument is an outdoor memorial commemorating Texan veterans who were disabled while serving in the United States military services, installed on the Texas State Capitol grounds in Austin, Texas, in 1980. The monument's base is made from Texas Sunset Red Granite, and features inscriptions and the bronze seal of the Disabled American Veterans.

See also

 1980 in art
 American Veterans Disabled for Life Memorial

References

External links
 

1980 establishments in Texas
1980 sculptures
Granite sculptures in Texas
Military monuments and memorials in the United States
Monuments and memorials in Texas
Outdoor sculptures in Austin, Texas